Dalia Leinartė (born October 25, 1958) is a member and former Chair of the UN Committee on the Elimination of Discrimination against Women (CEDAW), Professor at Vytautas Magnus University, and Fellow Commoner at Lucy Cavendish College, University of Cambridge. In 2018, Apolitical selected her as one of the 100 most influential people in gender policy around the world.

Education 
Leinarte was born in 1958, Trakai, Lithuania. In 1981, she graduated from Vilnius University and earned her PhD in history at Vytautas Magnus University in 1996. She was a Fulbright Scholar at State University of New York at Buffalo. In 2005, she won an International Scholarship of the American Association of University Women (AAUW). In 2009, Leinarte became full professor at Vilnius University.

Career 
After the collapse of the Soviet Union, Leinarte became actively involved in the promotion of women's rights and gender equality. Leinarte and her colleague are the first academics to have founded a non-governmental organization for women in Lithuania. The same organization, "Praeities Pėdos" (Traces of the Past), is also among the first Lithuanian organizations to introduce the notion of "women victims of trafficking".

Until 2017, she was Director of the Gender Studies Center at Vilnius University, and since 2000, she has been a consultant of the Inter-Ministerial Commission on Equal Opportunities of Women and Men, Lithuania. Leinarte drafted the Review of the Implementation of the Beijing Declaration and Platform for Action Adopted, at the Fourth World Conference on Women Beijing 1995 and participated in drafting the reports of Lithuania to CEDAW.

In 2007–2009 Leinarte was visiting professor at Idaho State University.

In 2012, Leinarte became the first person from an Eastern European country to be elected to the CEDAW Committee. After serving two years as vice-chair, she was elected as chair of the CEDAW Committee in 2017. 

Since 2014 she has been a Fellow Commoner at Lucy Cavendish College, University of Cambridge.

Since 2018 she has been Chair of the CEDAW Committee's Working Group on General Recommendation Trafficking in women and girls in the context of global migration.

Books 

The Lithuanian Family in its European Context, 1800-1914. Marriage, Divorce and Flexible Communities investigates marriage and divorce in Lithuania in the period from 1800 to 1914, focusing on the interaction between authorized marital behaviour and independent individual choices.

Adopting and Remembering Soviet Reality. Life Stories of Lithuanian Women, 1945–1970 consists of ten interviews and two introductory essays: "Conducting Interviews in the Post-Soviet Space" and "Women, Work, and Family in Soviet Lithuania". The book recounts the experiences of Lithuanian women in the postwar years, during the so-called "Khrushchev Thaw" and the beginning of the "Stagnation Era". It explores the strategies these women used to reconcile the demands of work and family, as well as their perceptions of gender roles, marriage and romantic love in Soviet society.

Awards and honors 
 (2019)The Cross of Officer of the Order for Merits to Lithuania, bestowed by the President of the Republic of Lithuania Dalia Grybauskaitė. 
 (2018) Association for the Advancement of Baltic Studies (AABS), Honorable mention for her book The Lithuanian Family in Its European Context, 1800-1914: Marriage, Divorce and Flexible Communities
 (2018) Gender Equality Top 100. The Most Influential People in Global Policy
 (2012) Women Inspiring Europe Award (European Institute for Gender Equality)
 (2010) Vilnius University Rector's Scientific Excellence Award
 (2005–2006) American Association of University Women, Research Scholar grant 
 (2002-2003) FULBRIGHT Scholar grant, State University of New York
 (1998) International Women's Solidarity Award, Norway

Books and selected articles 
Books:
 The Lithuanian Family in its European Context, 1800-1914: Marriage, Divorce and Flexible Communities. London: Palgrave Macmillan, 2017
 Cohabitation in Europe: a Revenge of History? Introduction & eds. Dalia Leinarte and Jan Kok. New York: Routledge, 2017
 Dalia Leinarte, Kelly Hignett, Melanie Ilic , Corina Snitar and Eszter Zsofia Toth. Women's Experiences of Repression in the Soviet Union and Eastern Europe, London: Routledge, 2017
 The Soviet Past in the Post-Soviet Present, Introduction and eds Melanie Ilic, Dalia Leinarte. New York: Routledge, 2015
 Dalia Leinarte. On emotions. The correspondence between Algirdas Julius Greimas and Aleksandra Kasuba, 1988–1992, 2011
 Adopting and Remembering Soviet Reality: Life Stories of Lithuanian Women, 1945–1970. Amsterdam, New York: Brill, 2010

Selected articles:
 Dalia Leinarte. Cohabitation in imperial Russia: the case of Lithuania // The History of the Family 17(1): 16-3, 2012
 Dalia Leinarte. Nationalism and family ideology: The case of Lithuania at the turn of the 20th century,'' 2006

References

External links 
 Official website

1958 births
21st-century Lithuanian women writers
21st-century Lithuanian historians
Living people
Vilnius University alumni
Vytautas Magnus University alumni
Academic staff of Vytautas Magnus University
Women historians
Lithuanian women's rights activists
20th-century Lithuanian historians